TV5 (also known as 5 formerly known as ABC), is a Philippine free-to-air television network owned by TV5 Network, Inc. with Cignal TV as its main content provider, both owned by MediaQuest Holdings, the media arm of PLDT. Headquartered on TV5 Media Center, Reliance, Mandaluyong City, with its alternate studios and transmitter located in Novaliches, Quezon City. The following is a list of programs broadcast by TV5 includes news and information programs from News5, sports programming from One Sports, their own entertainment programs from Cignal Entertainment, blocktime entertainment programs from ABS-CBN Entertainment, Brightlight Productions, Viva Television, APT Entertainment and Cornerstone Studios, Filipino-dubbed Japanese anime series and foreign cartoons, movie programming and television specials.

For the previously aired shows of the network, see the list of programs aired by TV5 (Philippine TV network).

Current original programming
Note: Titles are listed in alphabetical order, followed by the year of debut in parentheses.

Newscast
 Frontline Pilipinas 
 Frontline sa Umaga 
 Frontline Tonight 
 News5 Alerts 
 Ted Failon at DJ Chacha sa Radyo5

Drama
 Sa Ngalan ng Ina

Comedy
 Happy Naman D'yan!

Series
 Kurdapya 
 Team A: Happy Fam, Happy Life

Variety
 Tropang LOL

Lifestyle
 Healing Galing sa TV 
 Kusina ni Mamang

Infotainment/Travel 
 #MaineGoals

Public affairs
 Rated Korina

Sports
 PBA (2022–23 season)

Current acquired programming
Note: Titles are listed in alphabetical order, followed by the year of debut in parentheses.

ABS-CBN produced programs
Drama
 Dirty Linen 
 FPJ's Batang Quiapo 
 The Iron Heart 

Variety
 ASAP Natin 'To 
 It's Showtime 

Reality
 The Voice Kids 

Game
 I Can See Your Voice 

Talk
 Magandang Buhay 

Film presentation
 FPJ: Da King 

Foreign drama
 The Great Show

Animated
Codename: Kids Next Door 
Dexter's Laboratory 
The Powerpuff Girls 
Samurai Jack

Film presentation
 Cine Cinco Presents: Star Cinema 
 Lifetime Movies 
 Cine Spotlight Presents: Viva

Foreign drama
 La Suerte de Loli 
 Sin Verguenza 
True Beauty

Religious
 Healing Mass sa Veritas  
 In Touch with Dr. Charles Stanley 
 The Key of David 
 Oras ng Himala 
 Tomorrow's World 
 Word of God Network

Sports
 NBA (2022–23 season)

Regional programming

News
 Dateline TeleRadyo 
 Dateline Zamboanga 
 Frontline Eastern Visayas

Notes

See also
List of TV5 specials aired

References

External links
 TV5 official website

TV5 (Philippine TV network)
TV5 (Philippine TV network)
TV5 (Philippine TV network)